John Jones Pettus (October 9, 1813January 25, 1867) was an American politician and lawyer who served as the 23rd Governor of Mississippi, from 1859 to 1863. Before being elected in his own right to full gubernatorial terms in 1859 and 1861, he served as acting governor from January 5 to 10, 1854, following the resignation of Henry S. Foote. A member of the Democratic Party, Pettus had previously been a Mississippi state representative, a member and president of the Mississippi State Senate. He strongly supported Mississippi's declared secession from the United States in 1861 and sought cooperation with the Confederate States of America.

Early life
John Jones Pettus was born on October 9, 1813, in Wilson County, Tennessee, to John Jones, a farmer, and his wife Alice Taylor (née Winston) Pettus. He was the brother of Edmund Pettus. He was raised in Limestone County, Alabama, after his father moved the family from Tennessee. Only nine when his father died, Pettus helped with chores and was educated at home by his mother. Pettus settled in Mississippi in 1835. After a brief stay in Sumter County, Alabama, where he studied law, he opened a law practice in Scooba, Mississippi. In the 1840s, he married a cousin, Permelia Winston. He became a farmer and by 1850 owned  and enslaved twenty-four people.

Political career
In 1844, Pettus represented Kemper County in the Mississippi House of Representatives. In 1848, he was elected to the Mississippi Senate. In 1853, while Governor Henry S. Foote was waiting for the January 11 inauguration of John J. McRae, Foote grew bitter and angry, addressing the legislative session by announcing that he had considered resigning in protest once the election results came in. At noon on January 5, 1854, Foote's resignation was received by the state senate.

The Mississippi Constitution of 1832 had abolished the office of lieutenant governor. As President of the Mississippi Senate, Pettus was next in seniority and sworn in at noon on January 7, 1854. He held the governorship until McRae was sworn in on January 10, 1854. His only recorded act during these 120 hours was to order a special session in Noxubee County to fill the office of a deceased state representative, Francis Irby. On January 11, McRae was inaugurated as governor, and Pettus returned as senate president. During the 1850s, he became identified as "the Mississippi Fire-eater," a term referring to Southerners supporting secession.

In 1859, he was elected governor. In his inaugural address, he said that the south's only way to maintain slavery was secession and called for a southern confederacy. Following President Abraham Lincoln's election, on November 26, 1860, Pettus called for a Special Session of the Legislature and urged the legislature to call for a convention to withdraw Mississippi from the United States. The Legislature called for a Secession Convention which convened in Jackson on January 7, 1861. Two days later, Mississippi officially declared secession from the United States. On February 4, 1861, along with five other slave states, the Confederate States of America was established at Montgomery, Alabama, precipitating the American Civil War. Pettus was re-elected in the fall of 1861. Pettus was succeeded by Charles Clark.

Later life
Ineligible under the Mississippi Constitution to run for a third term, Pettus became a colonel in the state militia. In September 1865, he took the oath of allegiance to the United States but failed on three separate occasions to receive a presidential pardon. After the war, he relocated to Pulaski County (present-day Lonoke County, Arkansas. Pettus died on January 25, 1867, of pneumonia and is buried in the Flat Bayou Cemetery, Jefferson County, Arkansas.

See also 
 List of governors of Mississippi
 List of lieutenant governors of Mississippi
 List of people from Tennessee
 List of pneumonia deaths
 List of slave owners

References

Further reading

External links

 
 John J. Pettus at the National Governors Association
 John J. Pettus at The Political Graveyard
 
 

1813 births
1867 deaths
19th-century American lawyers
19th-century American politicians
American Fire-Eaters
American lawyers admitted to the practice of law by reading law
American slave owners
Burials at Flat Bayou Cemetery
Confederate States of America state governors
Deaths in Arkansas
Deaths from pneumonia in Arkansas
Democratic Party governors of Mississippi
Farmers from Mississippi
Lieutenant Governors of Mississippi
Democratic Party members of the Mississippi House of Representatives
Military personnel from Mississippi
Mississippi lawyers
Democratic Party Mississippi state senators
People from Kemper County, Mississippi
People from Wilson County, Tennessee
People of Mississippi in the American Civil War
Politicians from Jackson, Mississippi
Pettus family
Stateless people